Orthodes majuscula, the rustic Quaker, is a moth of the family Noctuidae. The species was first described by Gottlieb August Wilhelm Herrich-Schäffer in 1868. It is widespread throughout the New World, including eastern North America (from Nova Scotia to Florida, west to Arizona, north to Alberta), Cuba, Mexico, Costa Rica and Brazil.

The wingspan is 28–35 mm. The forewings are gray to brown with a black triangle in the middle of the collar. The lines on the forewing are sharp and yellowish. The hindwings are dark grayish brown. Adults are on wing from May to August.

The larvae feed on a wide range of plants, including dandelion, plantain, grasses and willow.

References

Moths described in 1868
Hadeninae
Moths of North America